The University of Chicago Law School is the law school of the University of Chicago, a private research university in Chicago, Illinois. It is consistently ranked among the best and most prestigious law schools in the world, and has many distinguished alumni in the judiciary, academia, government, politics and business. It employs more than 180 full-time and part-time faculty and hosts more than 600 students in its Juris Doctor program, while also offering the Master of Laws, Master of Studies in Law and Doctor of Juridical Science degrees in law. The law school has the highest percentage of recent graduates clerking for federal judges.

The law school was conceived in the 1890s by the president of the University of Chicago, William Rainey Harper. Harper and the law school's first Dean, Joseph Henry Beale, designed the school's curriculum with inspiration from Ernst Freund's interdisciplinary approach to legal education. The construction of the school was financed by John D. Rockefeller and the cornerstone was laid by United States then President Theodore Roosevelt. The law school opened for classes in 1902. Since its inception, the law school's professors have taught students using the Socratic Method, which remains the law school's predominant mode of teaching in lectures and seminars.

In the 1930s, the interdisciplinary nature of the law school's curriculum was further shaped by the law and economics movement. Economists Aaron Director and Henry Calvert Simons taught courses integrated with the antitrust curriculum taught by statesman Edward H. Levi, leading to the development of the Chicago school of economics and the Chicago School approach to antitrust law. The law school expanded rapidly in the 1950s under Levi's leadership and, in the 1970s and 1980s, many scholars in the social sciences were attracted to the school's influence in law and economics, including Nobel laureates Ronald Coase and Gary Becker and the most cited legal scholar of the 20th century, Richard A. Posner. Longstanding members of the law school faculty have included Cass Sunstein and Richard Epstein, two of the three most-cited legal scholars of the early 21st century, 44th U.S. President Barack Obama and U.S. Supreme Court justices Antonin Scalia, John Paul Stevens and Elena Kagan.

The law school's chief publication is the University of Chicago Law Review, which is among the top five most cited law reviews in the world. Students edit three other independent law journals, with another three journals overseen by faculty. The law school was originally housed in Stuart Hall, a Gothic-style limestone building on the campus's main quadrangles. Since 1959, it has been housed in an Eero Saarinen-designed building across the Midway Plaisance from the main campus of the University of Chicago. The building was expanded in 1987 and again in 1998. It was renovated in 2008, preserving most of Saarinen's original structure.

History

Establishment of a new law school in Chicago

When the University of Chicago was founded in 1892, its president William Rainey Harper expressed a desire to establish a law school for the university that would improve democratic government. At the time, Harper observed that, "[t]hus far democracy seems to have found no way of making sure that the strongest men should be placed in control of the country's business." Harper took advice from a number of his contemporaries. One such adviser, a professor at the University of Cambridge, suggested that the object of the new law school should be to train students to become "leaders of the bar and ornaments of the bench, inspiring teachers, scientific writers and wise reformers" and emphasising public law and comparative law. Another adviser, a member of the Chicago bar, suggested that Harvard Law School, led by Christopher Columbus Langdell and influenced by the casebook method at the time, had "lost touch with great leaders among jurists and lawyers" and that the new law school in Chicago should focus on "social economics" or "principles of statesmanship" for lawyers. Noted legal scholar Ernst Freund suggested that the law school promote an interdisciplinary approach to legal education, offering elective courses in subjects such as history and political science. Ultimately, Harper settled with the view that the study of law should not occur in a vacuum, and that it should take into account "the whole field of man as a social being".

In 1901, Harper announced that the new law school would be established the following year. He requested assistance from the faculty of Harvard Law School, whose dean at the time, James Barr Ames, granted professor Joseph Henry Beale a two-year leave of absence to serve as the first dean of the law school in Chicago. He did so on the condition that Chicago "have ideals and methods similar to [those of] the Harvard Law School". However, Ames objected to the proposed curriculum, which contemplated close affiliation with social science departments in the university and subjects that were not found in a traditional first-year law curriculum. He insisted that the faculty comprise "solely of persons who teach law in the strict sense of the word" and using the casebook method. Harper agreed to these terms, and together with Beale assembled the faculty and designed the curriculum. Harper departed from the understanding he had reached with Ames and hired Freund to teach property law, and the law school's curriculum was influenced by Freund's interdisciplinary approach. The founding faculty members were Blewett Harrison Lee and Julian Mack, who had both taught at the law school of Northwestern University; James Parker Hall, who had taught at Stanford Law School and turned down an offer to teach at Harvard Law School; Clarke Butler Whittier, who had also taught at Stanford; Harry A. Bigelow, a notable scholar at Boston University who recognised limitations in the casebook method; and Freund.

Founding and early period

On October 1, 1902, the law school opened for classes in the University Press Building (currently the Bookstore Building). John D. Rockefeller paid the $250,000 construction cost, and President Theodore Roosevelt laid its cornerstone. At the time of its opening, the law school consisted of 78 students (76 men and two women). It offered courses in contract law, torts, criminal law, property law, agency, and pleading, with electives in administrative law, corporations law, federal jurisdiction, Roman law, international law, and legal ethics. The law school invented the J.D. degree, and was just one of five law schools in the U.S. that required a college degree from its applicants as a prerequisite to admission. Its library, which was established in short order, housed some 18,000 volumes of law reports. In 1903, a year after the law school opened, enrolment at the law school grew rapidly as its student body increased to 126. Floyd R. Mechem, a professor at the University of Michigan Law School and pioneer in empirical legal studies at the time, joined the faculty and remained at the law school for 25 years until his death in 1928.

The law school prospered in its early years and fostered relationships with scholars in other fields, including economics, political science, psychology, and history. It also developed ties with members of the Chicago bar, who served as part-time faculty members and taught legal procedure and other practical courses. The law school's academic standards were recognized as at least equal to those of Harvard. In 1904, the law school moved to Stuart Hall on the main university campus. In the same year, Sophonisba Breckinridge became the first woman to graduate from the law school––a feat that had not yet been achieved at Yale Law School, Columbia Law School or Harvard.  In her autobiography, Breckinridge noted that "the fact that the law school, like the rest of the University ... accepted men and women students on equal terms was publicly settled". The law school also established its first alumni association in this period.

The law school faced considerable change in the years leading up to World War I and shortly thereafter. Beale returned to Harvard after his two-year leave of absence. In 1909, the eminent jurist Roscoe Pound taught at the law school for a year. The law school established a chapter of the Order of the Coif in 1911 and the Edward W. Hinton Moot Court program in 1914. During World War I, enrollment declined: in Spring 1917, 241 students were enrolled; this number dropped to 46 by Fall 1918. In 1920, Earl B. Dickerson became the first African-American to graduate from the law school. The law school's Black Law Students Association is named in his honor. Following the war, in 1926, enrollment reached 500 students for the first time. In 1927, the law school began to offer its first seminars. Its longest-serving dean, James Parker Hall, who played a significant role in recruiting numerous distinguished faculty members to the law school, died in office in 1928.

Growth in interdisciplinary approach and the leadership of Edward Levi

In the 1930s, new dean Harry A. Bigelow built on the interdisciplinary foundations laid by Freund and introduced classes in accounting, economics, and psychology. The law school's curriculum was shaped by the emerging influence of the law and economics movement. Aaron Director and Henry Simons began offering economics courses in 1933. Faculty member Edward Levi also introduced economics in the antitrust course, permitting Director to teach one of every five classroom sessions.  The first volume of the University of Chicago Law Review was also published in 1933. The law school established a legal writing program in 1938 and the Law and Economics Program in 1939. The LL.M. program was established in 1942, while Harry A. Bigelow Teaching Fellowships were established in 1947. As was the case during World War I, enrolment at the law school, like at many of the other top law schools in the country, declined and its academic calendar was adjusted to meet military needs.

In the 1950s and 1960s, the law school experienced a period of profound growth and expansion under the leadership of Edward Levi, who was appointed Dean in 1950. In 1951, Karl Llewellyn and Soia Mentschikoff joined the law school, the latter being the first woman on the faculty. Other notable scholars, widely regarded as institutional figures and leading thinkers in their respective areas, were Walter J. Blum and Bernard D. Meltzer, who studied and taught at the law school for their entire academic careers. Between 1953 and 1955, Supreme Court justice John Paul Stevens taught antitrust at the law school. In 1958, Director founded the Journal of Law and Economics. In 1959, the law school moved to its current building on 60th Street, designed by Eero Saarinen. In 1960, constitutional law scholar Philip Kurland founded the Supreme Court Review. Levi later served as the Provost (1962–1968) and the President (1968–1975) of the University of Chicago, before becoming the United States Attorney General under President Gerald Ford. During his time at the law school, Levi also supported the Committee on Social Thought graduate program.

Late 20th century

By the 1970s and 1980s, the law and economics movement had attracted a series of scholars with strong connections to the social sciences, such as Nobel laureates Ronald Coase and Gary Becker and scholars Richard A. Posner and William M. Landes. In 1972, Posner founded the Journal of Legal Studies. The law school also established joint degree programs with the Committee on Public Policy Studies and the Department of Economics, complementing Max Rheinstein's Foreign Law Program, which was established in the 1950s with a bequest from the Ford Foundation. The Legal History Program was established in 1981. In 1982, the Federalist Society was established by a group of students at the law school, together with students from Harvard Law School and Yale Law School. In 1989, the D'Angelo Law Library exceeded 500,000 volumes.

In the same period, many scholars who would later become leaders in their field joined the law school faculty at an early stage in their careers. Richard A. Epstein, identified in a Legal Affairs poll as one of the most influential legal thinkers of modern times, joined the faculty in 1973 and continues to serve as emeritus professor and senior lecturer. Geoffrey R. Stone, a leading First Amendment scholar and alumnus and former dean of the law school, joined the faculty in the same year. Douglas G. Baird, a luminary in bankruptcy law, has been on the faculty since 1980 and served as dean between 1994 and 1999. Cass Sunstein, regarded as "the most cited legal scholar in the United States and probably the world", began his teaching career at the law school in 1981 and served as a faculty member for 27 years. Former U.S. Supreme Court justice Antonin Scalia served as a professor between 1977 and 1982. His future colleague on the Supreme Court, Elena Kagan, began her career at the law school too, as did noted legal scholars Lawrence Lessig and Adrian Vermeule. The 44th President of the U.S. Barack Obama taught at the law school between 1992 and 2004 in the areas of constitutional law, racism and the law, and voting rights before he was elected to the U.S. Senate.

Academics
The law school currently employs more than 200 full-time and part-time faculty members and enrolls approximately 600 students in its Juris Doctor (J.D.) program. It also offers advanced legal degrees such as the Master of Laws (LL.M.) (or alternatively the M.C.L.), the Master of Legal Studies (M.L.S.) and the Doctor of Jurisprudence (J.S.D.). The J.D. degree may be combined with a Master of Business Administration (M.B.A.) or Doctor of Philosophy (Ph.D.) with the University of Chicago Booth School of Business, a Master of Arts (A.M.) in international relations, a Master of Public Policy (M.P.P.) with the University of Chicago Harris School of Public Policy, or a Master of Divinity (M.Div.) with the University of Chicago Divinity School.

The law school's professors use the Socratic Method to facilitate learning in lectures and seminars. This method includes calling on students without prior notice, presenting hypotheticals, and continuously questioning them to test their knowledge and application of the material and to flesh out underlying assumptions in their responses. It is one of the few law schools in the United States that employs this mode of teaching, which is assisted by its low student-to-professor ratio.

Clinics
The law school offers seven legal clinics, in which students earn course credit while practicing law under the direction of the clinic's independent faculty:
 Edwin F. Mandel Legal Aid Clinic, including:
Abrams Environmental Law Clinic
Civil Rights and Police Accountability Project
Criminal and Juvenile Justice Project Clinic
Employment Law Clinic
Federal Criminal Justice Clinic
Housing Initiative Transactional Clinic
Immigrants’ Rights Clinic
Global Human Rights Clinic
 Exoneration Project Clinic
 Innovation Clinic
 Institute for Justice Clinic on Entrepreneurship
 Jenner & Block Supreme Court and Appellate Clinic
 Kirkland & Ellis Corporate Lab Clinic

Research centers
The law school has six research centers and projects. Each center hosts events, activities, and guest speakers throughout the academic year. They are as follows:
 Becker Friedman Institute for Research in Economics
 Coase-Sandor Institute for Law and Economics
 Constitutional Law Institute
 Center for Comparative Constitutionalism
 Center for Law, Philosophy, and Human Values
 Center on Law and Finance

Policy initiatives
The law school has five current and past policy initiatives:
Animal Law Policy Initiative (2004–2007)
Court Reform in the Juvenile Justice System
Federal Tax Conference
Foster Care to Adulthood (2005–2008)
International Best Standards for Guest Worker Programs (2015–2017)
Kanter Project on Mass Incarceration (2013)

Programs
Legal History Program
The John M. Olin Program in Law and Economics
International and Comparative Law
Law and Philosophy

D'Angelo Law Library

The D'Angelo Law Library is part of the greater University of Chicago library system. Renovated in 2006, it features a second-story reading room. The Law Library is open 90 hours per week and employs 11 full-time librarians and 11 additional managers and staff members. It has study space for approximately 500 people, a wireless network and 26 networked computers. It contains over 700,000 volumes of books, with approximately 6,000 added each year, including materials in over 25 languages, and primary law from foreign countries and international organizations.

Admissions and cost
Admission to the J.D. program is highly competitive: in 2021, the law school enrolled 175 students from an applicant pool of 6,514. Overall, the acceptance rate was 11.91%  For the entering class of 2024, the 25th and 75th LSAT percentiles were 169 and 175, respectively, with a median of 172. The 25th and 75th undergraduate GPA percentiles were 3.82 and 3.98, respectively, with a median of 3.91.

Admission into the LL.M. program is also competitive: in 2020, the law school reported that it had received approximately 1,000 applications for 80 positions.

The total cost of attendance (indicating the cost of tuition, fees and living expenses) at the law school for the 2017–18 academic year was $93,414.

Grading
The law school employs a grading system that places students on a scale of 155–186. The scale was 55–86 prior to 2003, but since then the law school has used a prefix of "1" to eliminate confusion with the traditional 100 point grading scale. For classes of more than 10 students, professors are required to set the median grade at 177, with the number of grades above 180 approximately equaling the number of grades below a 173.

In an article published in The New York Times in 2010, business writer Catherine Rampell criticized other schools' problems with grade inflation, but commended Chicago's system, saying that Chicago "has managed to maintain the integrity of its grades."

Students graduate "with honors" by attaining a final average of 179, "with high honors" upon attaining a final average of 180.5, and "with highest honors" upon attaining a final average of 182. The last of these achievements is rare; typically only one student every few years will attain the requisite 182 average. Additionally, the law school awards two honors at graduation that are based on class rank. Of the students who earned at the law school at least 79 of the 105 credits required to graduate, the top 10% are elected to the Order of the Coif. Students finishing their first or second years in the top 5% of their class, or graduating in the top 10%, are honored as "Kirkland and Ellis Scholars."

Employment

Outcomes and career prospects
In 2018, the law school was ranked first in the U.S. for overall employment outcomes by the National Law Journal and second in the U.S. for best career prospects by Forbes. According to the law school's official 2020 ABA-required disclosures, 98.5% of the Class of 2019 obtained full-time, long-term, JD-required employment within ten months of graduation. The median salary for its graduates in the Class of 2019 was $190,000, and 75% of graduates earned starting salaries of $190,000 or greater upon graduation. For the same cohort, 50.2% of graduates secured positions at law firms with more than 500 lawyers. The law school is ranked first in the U.S. by the National Law Journal for placing the highest percentage of recent graduates in law firms of 100 or more lawyers. It also had the highest first-time Bar pass rate (98.9%) of all law schools in the United States.

Judicial clerkships

The law school is ranked first in the U.S. by the National Law Journal for placing the highest percentage of recent graduates in federal clerkships. A recent study reported that the law school has the third-highest gross and third-highest per capita placement of alumni in Supreme Court of the United States clerkships among all law schools since 1882. Between 1992 and 2017, it placed 88 alumni in Supreme Court of the United States clerkships. In the Class of 2019, 27.6% of its graduates secured clerkships (with 87.3% of those graduates in federal clerkships). In the 2022, nine of the law school's alumni clerked on the Supreme Court.

Rankings

The law school has a reputation as one of the best and most prestigious law schools in the world based on major education publications and rankings. The university is also included in the T14, a classification of consistently highest ranking U.S. law schools. It is ranked:
 third of all law schools in the world (third in the U.S.) by the Academic Ranking of World Universities
 fourth in the world (second in the U.S.) by the Times Higher Education World University Rankings
 first in the U.S. by Above the Law and second by Business Insider
 third in the U.S. by U.S. News & World Report (outranking Harvard Law School for the first time in over two decades)
 second in the U.S. in terms of scholarly impact in a 2021 study by Gregory Sisk et al
 second in the U.S. for best career prospects by Forbes
 third in the U.S. for highest-earning graduates by Forbes
 third in the U.S. for best professors and for federal clerkships by the Princeton Review
 fourth in the U.S. for best classroom experience by the Princeton Review

Publications and organizations

Journals
The law school produces seven professional journals. Four of those journals are student-run: the University of Chicago Law Review, the Chicago Journal of International Law, the University of Chicago Legal Forum, and the University of Chicago Business Law Review. The University of Chicago Law Review is among the top five most cited law reviews in the world. The other three are overseen by faculty: the Supreme Court Review, the Journal of Law and Economics and the Journal of Legal Studies.

Academic paper series
The law school produces several series of academic papers, including the Kreisman Working Papers Series in Housing Law and Policy, the Coase-Sandor Working Paper Series in Law and Economics, the Fulton Lectures, and the Public Law and Legal Theory Working Papers, in addition to a series of occasional papers.

Organizations
There are approximately 60 student-run organizations at the law school which fall under the umbrella of the Law Students Association. It is home to one of the three founding chapters of the Federalist Society. As a professor, former Supreme Court justice Antonin Scalia helped to organize the Chicago chapter of the society. Chicago is also home to a large chapter of the progressive American Constitution Society for Law and Policy.

Architecture

The law school was originally housed in Stuart Hall, a Gothic-style limestone building on the campus's main quadrangles. Needing more library and student space, the law school moved across the Midway Plaisance to its current, Eero Saarinen-designed building (next to what was then the headquarters of the American Bar Association) in October 1959. The building contains classrooms, the D'Angelo Law Library, faculty offices, and an auditorium and courtroom, arranged in a quadrangle around a fountain (mimicking the college Gothic architecture of the campus's main quadrangles). The year saw a number of celebrations of the law school's new home, including a filming of The Today Show and appearances by Chief Justice Earl Warren, Governor (and later Vice President) Nelson Rockefeller and Secretary-General of the United Nations Dag Hammarskjöld.

In 1987, and over the objections of the Saarinen family, the building was expanded to add office and library space (and the library renamed in honor of alumnus Dino D'Angelo). In 1998, a dedicated space for the law school's clinics, the Arthur Kane Center for Clinical Legal Education, as well as numerous additional classrooms, were constructed. Renovation of the library, classrooms, offices, and fountain was completed in 2008, notable for the preservation of most of Saarinen's structure at a time when many modernist buildings faced demolition.

Deans

Joseph Henry Beale (1902–1904)
James Parker Hall (1904–1928)
 Harry A. Bigelow (1929–1939)
 Wilber G. Katz (1939–1950)
Edward H. Levi (1950–1962)
 Phil C. Neal (1963–1975)
Norval Morris (1975–1979)
Gerhard Casper (1979–1987)
Geoffrey R. Stone (1987–1993)
Douglas Baird (1994–1999)
Daniel Fischel (1999–2001)
Saul Levmore (2001–2009)
Michael H. Schill (2010–2015)
Thomas J. Miles (2015–present)

Notable faculty
The law school's faculty has included the 44th U.S. President Barack Obama, Supreme Court justices Antonin Scalia, John Paul Stevens and Elena Kagan, leaders of the legal realism movement Karl Llewellyn and Herman Oliphant, tax law doyen Walter J. Blum, leading constitutional law scholars Harry Kalven and Michael W. McConnell, founder of the law and literature movement James Boyd White, and one of the most widely-cited legal scholars in the world, Cass Sunstein. Its current faculty includes Kyoto Prize winner Martha Nussbaum, distinguished legal philosopher Brian Leiter, First Amendment scholar Geoffrey R. Stone, federal appellate judges Frank H. Easterbrook and Diane P. Wood, bankruptcy expert Douglas Baird, prominent legal historian Richard H. Helmholz, and among the most widely-cited legal scholars of the 20th and 21st centuries Richard A. Posner, Richard A. Epstein and Eric Posner.

Current

 Daniel Abebe: constitutional law and international law scholar
 Albert Alschular: scholar on criminal law and criminal procedure
 Douglas Baird: scholar on bankruptcy law and contracts
 William Baude: scholar on constitutional law and interpretation
 Omri Ben-Shahar: contracts and consumer protection scholar
 Lisa Bernstein: contracts and commercial law scholar
 Curtis Bradley: international law and foreign relations scholar
 Emily Buss: scholar on children and parents' rights
 Anthony J. Casey (alumnus): scholar on business law, finance, and bankruptcy
 Kenneth W. Dam (emeritus, alumnus): scholar on law and economics and international law
 Dhammika Dharmapala: economist and tax scholar
 Frank H. Easterbrook (alumnus): United States circuit judge of the United States Court of Appeals for the Seventh Circuit and leading antitrust scholar
 Richard A. Epstein (emeritus): scholar on classical liberalism, libertarianism, torts, Roman Law, contract and law and economics
 Daniel Fischel (emeritus, alumnus): law and economics scholar, and chairman and president of Compass Lexecon
 Tom Ginsburg: scholar on international and comparative law
 Richard H. Helmholz: legal historian and expert on European legal history
 M. Todd Henderson (alumnus): scholar on corporations law and securities regulation
 William H. J. Hubbard (alumnus): civil procedure and law and economics scholar
 Aziz Huq: scholar on constitutional law, federal courts, and criminal procedure
 Dennis J. Hutchinson (alumnus): constitutional law scholar and former editor of the Supreme Court Review
 Alison LaCroix: legal historian and constitutional law scholar
 William Landes: economist and law and economics scholar
 Brian Leiter: legal philosopher and scholar on Nietzsche
 Saul Levmore: former Dean of the law school and scholar on commercial law and public choice
 Jonathan Masur: behavioral law and economics, patent law, and administrative law scholar
 Thomas J. Miles:  law and economics scholar
 Jennifer Nou: scholar on administrative law and regulatory policy
 Martha Nussbaum: influential philosopher and expert on ancient Greek and Roman philosophy, political philosophy, feminism, and ethics
 Randal C. Picker (alumnus): scholar on antitrust and intellectual property law
 Eric Posner: scholar on international law and contract law, and one of the most cited law professors in the U.S.
 Richard A. Posner: former federal appellate judge and the most cited legal scholar of the 20th century.
 John Rappaport: criminal procedure and criminal law scholar
 Gerald N. Rosenberg: leading scholar on political science and law, and author of The Hollow Hope (1991)
 Andrew M. Rosenfield (alumnus): economist, CEO and managing partner of TGG Group, and managing partner of Guggenheim Partners
 Geoffrey R. Stone (alumnus): leading scholar on constitutional law and the First Amendment
 Lior Strahilevitz: property law and privacy law scholar
 David A. Strauss: constitutional law scholar
 Diane P. Wood: Chief United States circuit judge of the United States Court of Appeals for the Seventh Circuit

Former

 Mortimer J. Adler
 Amabel Anderson Arnold
 Paul M. Bator
 Stephanos Bibas
 Harry A. Bigelow
 Walter J. Blum (alumnus)
 Lea Brilmayer
 Gerhard Casper
 Ronald Coase, winner of the Nobel Memorial Prize in Economic Sciences
 Morris Raphael Cohen
 Brainerd Currie
 David P. Currie
 Kenneth Culp Davis
 Aaron Director
 Justin Driver
 Ulrich Drobnig
 Owen M. Fiss
 Ernst Freund
 Elizabeth Garrett
 Grant Gilmore
 Douglas Ginsburg (alumnus)
 Jack Goldsmith
 Philip Hamburger
 Bernard Harcourt
 Geoffrey C. Hazard Jr.
 Edward W. Hinton (after whom the Hinton Moot Court Competition is named)
 James F. Holderman
 Elena Kagan, Justice of the Supreme Court of the United States 
 Dan Kahan
 Harry Kalven (alumnus)
 Stanley Nider Katz
 Nicholas Katzenbach, former Attorney General of the United States
 Friedrich Kessler
 Spencer L. Kimball
 Larry Kramer (alumnus)
 Anthony Kronman
 Philip Kurland
 John H. Langbein
 Douglas Laycock (alumnus)
 Lawrence Lessig
 Karl Llewellyn
 Edward Levi, former Attorney General of the United States (alumnus)
 Jonathan R. Macey
 Julian Mack
 Michael W. McConnell (alumnus)
 Tracey Meares (alumnus)
 Bernard D. Meltzer (alumnus)
 Soia Mentschikoff
 Abner Mikva (alumnus)
 William R. Ming (alumnus)
 Norval Morris
 Edward R. Morrison (alumnus)
 Dallin H. Oaks (alumnus)
 Barack Obama (1992 to 2004), former President of the United States
 Herman Oliphant (alumnus)
 Douglas H. Parker
 Eduardo Peñalver
 Roscoe Pound
 George L. Priest (alumnus)
 John Mark Ramseyer
 Max Rheinstein
 Antonin Scalia, former Justice of the Supreme Court of the United States
 Michael H. Schill
 Stephen Schulhofer
 Richard Scott, Baron Scott of Foscote, former Lord of Appeal
 Henry Simons
 A. W. B. Simpson
 Anne-Marie Slaughter
 John Paul Stevens, former Justice of the Supreme Court of the United States
 Cass Sunstein
 Jacobus tenBroek
 Adrian Vermeule
 James Boyd White
 Hans Zeisel

Notable alumni

The law school has produced many distinguished alumni in the judiciary, government and politics, academia, business, and other fields. Its alumni include heads of state and politicians around the world, the Lord Chief Justice of England and Wales, the President of the Supreme Court of Israel, judges of United States Courts of Appeals, several U.S. Attorneys General and Solicitors General, members of Congress and cabinet officials, Privy Counsellors, university presidents and faculty deans, founders of the law firms Kirkland & Ellis, Baker McKenzie, and Jenner & Block, CEOs and chairpersons of multinational corporations, and contributors to literature, journalism, and the arts. The law school counts among its alumni recipients of the Presidential Medal of Freedom, Fulbright Scholars, Rhodes Scholars, Marshall Scholars, Commonwealth Fellows, National Humanities Medallists, and Pulitzer Prize winners.

In the judiciary, notable alumni include Lord Thomas, who served as Lord Chief Justice of England and Wales from 2013 to 2017, and former President of the Supreme Court of Israel, Shimon Agranat. Federal appellate judges who graduated from the law school include Douglas H. Ginsburg, David S. Tatel, Michael W. McConnell and Robert Bork, who was unsuccessfully nominated to the U.S. Supreme Court. Other federal appellate judges include Abner Mikva, who later served as White House Counsel in the Clinton administration; Frank H. Easterbrook, who currently teaches at the law school; and Jerome Frank, who served as Chairman of the Securities and Exchange Commission and, together with fellow alumnus Herman Oliphant, played a leading role in the legal realism movement in the U.S.

Notable alumni in government and politics include Attorneys General John Ashcroft, Ramsey Clark and Edward H. Levi, who was Dean of the law school from 1950 to 1962.  The last Solicitor General of the United States, Noel Francisco, graduated from the law school in 1996. Other graduates include the former Prime Minister of New Zealand, Geoffrey Palmer; prosecutor at the Nuremberg trials and drafter of the U.N. Charter, Bernard D. Meltzer; former FBI director, James Comey; former United States Secretary of the Interior and key figure in the implementation of the New Deal, Harold L. Ickes; former Secretary of Health, Education, and Welfare, Abraham Ribicoff; the first director of the Consumer Financial Protection Bureau, Richard Cordray; former White House Counsel Pat Cipollone; current U.S. senator Amy Klobuchar, and U.S. Representative and United States House Select Committee on the January 6 Attack Vice-Chair Liz Cheney, among other members of Congress.

Alumni who are leaders in higher education include the current president of Princeton University, Christopher L. Eisgruber; the current Dean of the University of Texas School of Law, Ward Farnsworth; the former Dean of Stanford Law School, Larry Kramer; the co-chair of the COVID-19 Advisory Board, head of Operation Warp Speed, and former Dean of the Yale School of Medicine, David A. Kessler; the former Dean of Cornell Law School, Roger C. Cramton; and the former Dean of Vanderbilt University Law School, Tulane University Law School and Cornell Law School, William Ray Forrester. Scholars who graduated from the law school include Harvard Law School professor Mary Ann Glendon, who is a former U.S. ambassador to the Holy See; First Amendment scholar Geoffrey R. Stone; tax law doyen Walter J. Blum; and one of the pre-eminent constitutional law scholars of the 20th century, Harry Kalven.

In business, notable alumni include the billionaire and founder of the Carlyle Group, David Rubenstein; the former CEO and president of Bloomberg L.P. and the current CEO of Sidewalk Labs, Daniel L. Doctoroff; the executive chairman of Hyatt Hotels Corporation, Thomas Pritzker; the chairman and president of Compass Lexecon and an emeritus professor at the law school, Daniel Fischel; former president of Weyerhaeuser and of Boy Scouts of America, Norton Clapp; the current commissioner of the NBA, Adam Silver; and the founder of Yammer, David O. Sacks. In the field of non-governmental organizations, alumni include the founder and CEO of the International Justice Mission, Gary Haugen; and co-founder of Amnesty International, Luis Kutner.

The law school also counts among its alumni four recipients of the Presidential Medal of Freedom; two Pulitzer Prize winners; the first female African-American U.S. senator, Carol Moseley Braun; the first African-American to serve as a United States federal judge, James Benton Parsons; civil rights attorney and chairman of the Fair Employment Practices Committee, Earl B. Dickerson; the first female president of the American Law Institute and of the American Bar Association, Roberta Cooper Ramo; Pulitzer Prize-winner Studs Terkel; civil rights activist and the first woman to graduate from the law school, Sophonisba Breckinridge; and the founder of the intelligent design movement, Phillip E. Johnson.

References

External links

Guide to the University of Chicago Law School Arbitration Study Records 1916-1966 at the University of Chicago Special Collections Research Center
Guide to the University of Chicago Law School Jury Project Records 1953-1959 at the University of Chicago Special Collections Research Center

 
Law schools in Illinois
University of Chicago
Schools of the University of Chicago
Eero Saarinen structures
Educational institutions established in 1902
1902 establishments in Illinois